Daniel E. Saban (born 1956) is the former police chief of Buckeye, Arizona, United States of America and three-time candidate for sheriff of Maricopa County, Arizona. Saban ran as a Republican in 2004, as a Democrat in 2008, and again as a Republican in 2016.

Early life and career
Saban has a bachelor's degree from Arizona State University in justice studies and a master's degree from Northern Arizona University in human relations and educational leadership.

Saban worked as a law enforcement professional for 32 years, serving in the Maricopa County Sheriff's Office (1975–1979), Mesa Police Department (1979–2004; Commander, ret.) and Buckeye Police Department (2005–2008; Chief of Police). Saban now owns The Saban Group, LLC, a law enforcement litigation and consulting company.

Political career
Saban has alleged that he was a victim of his political rival, Maricopa County Sheriff Joe Arpaio. During Saban's 2004 run for sheriff, Arpaio opened a criminal investigation into a 30-year-old allegation that Saban, then 17, had raped his adoptive mother. Saban lost the election and sued for defamation and lost but cost the county $800,000 in legal fees.

Saban was endorsed by The Arizona Republic and the Phoenix New Times when he ran in 2008.

2008 election results

References

http://apps.mesaaz.gov/meetingarchive/ArchiveDocuments/Documents/%7B51461697-A985-4D4C-BD06-7CBF8006C7CC%7D_0.pdf

https://www.policeone.com/archive/articles/29033-Mesa-police-crack-downon-designer-drug-users/

http://archive.azcentral.com/arizonarepublic/local/articles/2008/10/20/20081020sabaninbuckeye1020.html

http://www.westvalleyview.com/content/buckeye-chief-fires-another-officer

http://westvalley.server340.com/content/buckeye-police-offer-part-time-positions

http://westvalleyview.com/content/advocacy-center-opens

Living people
Arizona State University alumni
Northern Arizona University alumni
Arizona sheriffs
Politicians from Phoenix, Arizona
People from Buckeye, Arizona
1956 births